Bertil Hallin, born 30 December 1931, is a Swedish church musician and music teacher, active in Malmö. He participated as an expert in the hymn commission of 1969, which led to the creation of the 1986 Swedish hymnal.

References 

1931 births
Living people
Swedish male musicians